Players of United States of America (also known simply as Players) was an invitational cricket team which took part in several first-class fixtures in the United States in the late 19th century, mostly against Philadelphians (whom they played six times, winning two and drawing three) and touring international teams.

References

See also

United States cricket in the 19th century
United States in international cricket
Defunct sports teams in the United States
Former senior cricket clubs in the United States